"Lovesong" (sometimes written as "Love Song") is a song by English rock band the Cure, released as the third single from their eighth studio album, Disintegration (1989), on 21 August 1989. The song saw considerable success in the United States, where it reached the number-two position in October 1989 and became the band's only top-10 entry on the Billboard Hot 100. In the United Kingdom, the single charted at number 18, and it peaked within the top 20 in Canada and Ireland.

The song has been covered by several artists, with notable cover versions by American rock band 311, recorded for the soundtrack for the film 50 First Dates and also released as a single. This song was also performed by Adele on her 2011 album 21.

Content

The song is performed in A minor and is built around a distinctive bass riff. The verses follow an Am/G/F/Em chord progression, which changes to F/G/Am/C in the choruses. The lyrics are simple, with each verse having the same structure ("Whenever I'm alone with you / you make me feel like I am ... again"). Speaking of its simplicity and unusually upbeat nature compared to the other tracks on Disintegration, Robert Smith stated, "It's an open show of emotion. It's not trying to be clever. It's taken me ten years to reach the point where I feel comfortable singing a very straightforward love song."

The single version of the song is almost exactly the same as the album version, but the mix is slightly different, with extra reverb and harmonies added to Smith's vocals. In addition, in the instrumental section between the first two verses, the guitar does not join the keyboards as it does on the album.

Title
Similar to the title variations of the Cure song "In Between Days", there is not a universally agreed-upon spacing method of the title of "Lovesong", as it varies between "Lovesong" and "Love Song" on many official Cure releases. The original 1989 artwork for the album Disintegration uses "Love Song" on the track listing and "Lovesong" on the lyrics sheet; the revised art for the 2010 remaster of the album consistently uses "Lovesong". When released as a single in 1989, the cover artwork displayed the title as "Lovesong", while the printing on the disc itself read "Love Song" all three times. Subsequent releases of Paris and Galore both use "Lovesong" exclusively, while 2001's Greatest Hits compilation uses "Lovesong" on the track listing and "Love Song" within the liner notes. 2004's Join the Dots also uses "Lovesong" within the booklet presentation.

Release
Upon release as a single, the song received worldwide success, and peaked at number two on the US Billboard Hot 100, making it the group's most successful single in the United States. The song also charted at number two on the Billboard Modern Rock Tracks chart, number 30 on the Billboard Mainstream Rock Tracks chart and number 18 on the UK Singles Chart. Smith originally wrote the song for his long-time girlfriend and then fiancée, Mary, as a wedding present.

The extended mix version of the song was included on the bands 1990 remix album Mixed Up. An instrumental demo version recorded by the band was featured on the second disk of the 2010 re-release of Disintegration. A music video featuring the band performing inside a cave was also released with the single.

Track listings
7-inch single
 "Lovesong" – 3:24
 "2 Late" –  2:40

12-inch single
 "Lovesong" (extended mix)
 "2 Late"
 "Fear of Ghosts"

CD single
 "Lovesong" (remix) – 3:24
 "Lovesong" (extended remix) – 6:18
 "2 Late"
 "Fear of Ghosts"

Personnel
 Robert Smith – vocals, guitar, keyboards
 Simon Gallup – bass guitar
 Porl Thompson – guitar
 Boris Williams – drums, percussion
 Roger O'Donnell – keyboards
 Lol Tolhurst – (officially, in album credits) "other instrument"
 Mark Saunders – remix

Charts

Weekly charts

Year-end charts

Certifications

311 version

"Love Song" was released as a single by the band 311 and is featured on the soundtrack of the 2004 film 50 First Dates. It is also featured on 311's greatest hits album, Greatest Hits '93–'03. While the Cure's original version hit number 2 on the Alternative Songs chart, 311's cover was more successful on the chart, hitting number 1. 311's cover also reached number 59 on the Billboard Hot 100, making it the band's first single to make the chart. 311's cover was also very successful in the adult contemporary radio market, hitting the top 10 on the Adult Top 40 chart at number 7.

Music video
The music video features 311 playing the song in a bar. While not featured in the version on YouTube, the version initially released for the song in conjunction with, and featuring footage from, 50 First Dates, features a cameo from former Cure member Lol Tolhurst as a bartender. His appearance is at 2:22 in the video.

Charts

Weekly charts

Year-end charts

Other versions
The track has been covered by Jes in various trance and acoustic styles, as well as the Brunettes for the 2008 American Laundromat Records tribute album Just Like Heaven – a tribute to The Cure. The song has also been covered by the bands A Perfect Circle (as a mashup with "Diary of a Madman"), Good Charlotte, the Deluxtone Rockets, Jack Off Jill, Snake River Conspiracy, Azam Ali/Niyaz, Death Cab for Cutie, Anberlin, Seafood (who released their cover of the song as a single in June 2007) and Fordirelifesake. Canadian musical duo Dala recorded their cover of the song on the 2005 album Angels & Thieves. Canadian psychobilly band the Brains recorded their version of the song in 2014 on their The Cover Up EP. Dutch indie band This Beautiful Mess recorded a version for a compilation of 80's cover hits.

Solo artists have performed covers as well, such as Tori Amos during several live performances, most famously on the radio station KROQ-FM. Naimee Coleman included an interpretation of the song on her 2001 album Bring Down The Moon. Voltaire released an acoustic cover on his album Then and Again.  It was also covered by Maltese singer Ira Losco, found on her 2007 unplugged album Unmasked. Japanese singer Immi included a cover of the song on her debut album Switch. American folk singer Mariee Sioux covered the song for the tribute album Perfect as Cats: A Tribute to The Cure in 2008. British singer Adele included a bossa nova cover of the song on her second album, 21, which peaked at #18 on Billboard's Smooth Jazz Songs chart. Nina Sky covered this song on their 2010 EP The Other Side.

The song was covered by Captain during a BBC Radio 2 live session with Dermot O'Leary. The American Indie-pop band Koufax covered it in several live apparitions.

The Big Pink provided a cover of "Lovesong" for The Cure tribute album Pictures of You: A Tribute to Godlike Geniuses The Cure, which was made available with the 25 February 2009 issue of NME.

References

1980s ballads
1989 singles
1989 songs
2004 singles
311 (band) songs
Adele songs
The Cure songs
Fiction Records singles
Jes (musician) songs
Music videos directed by Tim Pope
Rock ballads
Song recordings produced by David M. Allen
Songs written by Lol Tolhurst
Songs written by Porl Thompson
Songs written by Robert Smith (musician)
Songs written by Roger O'Donnell
Songs written by Simon Gallup